Fawcett is a hamlet in central Alberta, Canada within Westlock County.

The community has the name of a railroad officer.

Demographics 

Notable residents 
Fawcett is the hometown of professional hockey player and actor Ross Smith.  Ross portrayed the character Barclay Donaldson in the 1977 movie Slap Shot. Casey Fawcett, the previous World Record holder for most glasses held in a single hand, is also a resident of Fawcett.

See also 
List of communities in Alberta
List of designated places in Alberta
List of hamlets in Alberta

References 

Hamlets in Alberta
Designated places in Alberta
Westlock County